Aarón Mastache Mondragón (born 1 July 1955) is a Mexican politician from the Party of the Democratic Revolution. In 2012 he served as Deputy of the LXI Legislature of the Mexican Congress representing the Federal District.

References

1955 births
Living people
Politicians from Guerrero
People from Iguala
Party of the Democratic Revolution politicians
21st-century Mexican politicians
Deputies of the LXI Legislature of Mexico
Members of the Chamber of Deputies (Mexico) for Mexico City